Symeon, called Metaphrastes or the Metaphrast (died c. 1000), was a Byzantine writer and official. He is regarded as a saint in the Eastern Orthodox Church and his feast day falls on 9 or 28 November. He is best known for his 10-volume Greek menologion, or collection of saints' lives.

Life
About Symeon's life few details are known. He lived in the second half of the 10th century. Ephrem Mtsire puts him at the peak of his career in the sixth year of Basil II (982). Yahya of Antioch also makes him a contemporary of Basil II and Patriarch Nicholas II of Constantinople (984–991). In the 15th century, Mark Eugenikos wrongly called Symeon a megas logothetes. The hagiographer actually lived a generation later than the historian Symeon Logothete.

Symeon wrote mainly hymnody and hagiography. He composed kanones, stichera and a hymn to the Trinity. He also compiled excerpts of the church fathers, particularly Basil the Great. His most important work by far, however, is the menologion, which Albert Ehrhard labelled "a revolution in the field of hagiography". According to tradition, it was commissioned by Basil II.

Symeon's menologion is a product of the encyclopedism characteristic of the Macedonian Renaissance. He did not merely collect and arrange pre-existing saint's lives, but also reworked them, standardizing their language and embellishing their rhetorical style to bring them in line with the Atticism of the day. His nickname comes from this act of metaphrasis. The content of the lives was not altered, however, and historical errors were left intact. Symeon arranged them according to their feast days in the Eastern Orthodox liturgical calendar. There are about 150 distinct lives.

For his menologion, Symeon received praise from Nikephoros Ouranos and Michael Psellos addressed to him an encomium. It was widely read in monasteries. The standard edition came in ten volumes. Numerous illuminated copies were produced in the 11th century.

Some orthodox prayers of preparation before Holy Communion and prayers of thanksgiving after Holy Communion were composed by him.

Veneration 
Venerable Symeon the Metaphrast is venerated in the Eastern Orthodox Church. Michael Psellos compiled Symeon's biography ( 1050) and he composed a liturgical office for him.

References

Further reading 
Leo Allatius, De Symeonum scriptis diatriba (Paris, 1664)
Ferdinand Hirsch, Byzantinische Studien, pp. 303–355 (Leipzig, 1876)
Albert Ehrhard, Die Legendensammlung des Symeon Metaphrastes (Rome, 1897)
Römische Quartalschrift (1897), pp. 67205 and 531-553
Hippolyte Delehaye, "La vie de saint Paul le Jeune et la chronologie de Metaphraste (1893)
 Analecta Bollandiana, xvi. 312-327 and xvii. 448-452.
 Christian Høgel: Symeon Metaphrastes. Rewriting and Canonization'' (Copenhagen 2002)

External links 
Greek Opera Omnia by Migne Patrologia Graeca with analytical indexes

10th-century births
Year of death missing
Greek religious writers
Christian hagiographers
Byzantine saints of the Eastern Orthodox Church
10th-century Christian saints
10th-century Byzantine writers
Catholic saints
Eastern Orthodox saints
Catholic monks
Logothetes
Philokalia